Diego de Romano y Govea (1538 – 12 April 1606) served as Bishop of Tlaxcala (1578–1606).

Biography
Diego de Romano y Govea was born in Valladolid, Spain.  On January 13, 1578, Pope Gregory XIII appointed him as Bishop of Tlaxcala. On December 2, 1578, he was installed as bishop. He served as Bishop of  Tlaxcala until his death on 12 April 1606.

Episcopal succession
While bishop, he was the principal consecrator of:
Bartolomé de Ledesma, Bishop of Panamá; 
Francisco Santos García de Ontiveros y Martínez, Bishop of Guadalajara; 
Ignacio Santibáñez, Archbishop of Manila; 
Pedro de Agurto, Bishop of Cebu; 
Bartolomé Lobo Guerrero, Archbishop of Santafé en Nueva Granada; 
Baltazar de Cobarrubias y Múñoz, Bishop of Paraguay; 
and the principal co-consecrator of:
Alfonso Graniero Avalos, Bishop of La Plata o Charcas.

References

External links and additional sources
 (for Chronology of Bishops) 
 (for Chronology of Bishops) 

1538 births
1606 deaths
Bishops appointed by Pope Gregory XIII
16th-century Roman Catholic bishops in Mexico
17th-century Roman Catholic bishops in Mexico